Provost Airport  is located  south of Provost, Alberta, Canada.

References

External links
Place to Fly on COPA's Places to Fly airport directory

Registered aerodromes in Alberta
Municipal District of Provost No. 52